Hypsipetes affinis harterti may refer to:

 Taiwan brown-eared bulbul, a subspecies of bird found in Taiwan 
 Banggai golden bulbul, a subspecies of bird found in Indonesia